This is a list of regicides.

Definitions 

The etymology of "regicide" is from the Latin noun rex ("king") and the Latin verb caedere ("to kill"); thus, a regicide is literally a "king-killing". Different cultures and authors in history have used different definitions for what constitutes the crime of regicide. Rex is usually but not always understood to refer to not just kings, but any type of monarch, which leads to semantic problems of scope. Some monarchs, such as Nicholas II and Haile Selassie, had already ceased to be de facto rulers at the time of their deaths due to forced or voluntary abdication, but especially after forced abdications (depositions), these monarchs (and their supporters) often still saw themselves as the de jure rulers; therefore, whether a current monarch or former monarch had been killed could be a point of view on their legitimacy. A well-known controversy in historiography is the 1793 Execution of Louis XVI: Legitimists might say it was a "regicide" of the legitimate "King Louis XVI" by "the rabble", but French Revolutionaries could have regarded it as the "lawful execution" of "citizen Louis Capet" after a "fair trial" that had found him guilty. Other killings, such as the assassination of Archduke Franz Ferdinand, are generally disqualified as "regicides", because this crown prince had not yet taken the throne. Suicide is generally discounted as well. As such, it is difficult to make a universally accepted list of what constitutes a regicide. The following is a list of cases of monarchs in history who were deliberately killed by someone else in some fashion, according to reliable sources.

2000 -1000 BC 
 1962 BC Amenemhat I, of the Middle Kingdom of Egypt by his own bodyguards
 1526 BC Mursili I, King of the Hittites by his brother-in-law Hantili I
 Unknown date in late 2nd millennium BC, Eglon of Moab by Ehud
 1155 BC Ramesses III of New Kingdom of Egypt from a neck wound inflicted by conspirators
 11th century BC Agag of Amalek by the prophet Samuel
 1005 BC Ish-bosheth of Israel, slain by his own captains

900 - 500 BC 
 900 BC Nadab of Israel, slain by his own captain Baasha
 885 BC King Elah of Israel, murdered by his chariot commander Zimri
 841 BC Jehoram of Israel, murdered by Jehu
 836 BC Athaliah, Queen of Judah, by rebels that placed Jehoash on the throne
 797 BC Jehoash of Judah by his own servants at Miloh
 771 BC King You of Zhou by the Marquess of Shen
 767 BC Amaziah of Judah assassinated at Lachish
 752 BC Zechariah of Israel murdered by Shallum
 740 or 737 BC Pekahiah, King of Israel, assassinated by Pekah, son of Remaliah
 732 BC Pekah, King of Israel, by Hoshea 
 681 BC Sennacherib, King of Assyria, assassinated in obscure circumstances
 641 BC Amon of Judah, assassinated by own servants
514 BC, Hipparchus of Athens, assassinated by two lovers

5th century BC 
 465 BC Xerxes I of Persia by his chief bodyguard Artabanus
 424 BC Xerxes II of Persia by his brother Sogdianus

4th century BC 
336 BC Philip II of Macedon, assassinated by his own bodyguard.
 330 BC Darius III of Persia, assassinated by his general Bessus
 323 BC Alexander III of Macedon, Died of an unknown illness, though many speculate that he was poisoned
 317 BC Philip III of Macedon, executed by his stepmother Olympias
315 BC, Porus the Elder, king of Pauravas, present day India, assassinated by one of Alexander's generals
 309 BC Alexander IV of Macedon, assassinated at the age of 14 by the regent Cassander

3rd century BC 
 294 BC Alexander V of Macedon, assassinated by Demetrius Poliorcetes
 281 BC Seleucus I Nicator, assassinated by Ptolemy Ceraunus
 249 BC Demetrius of Cyrene, assassinated by his wife Berenice II
 246 BC Antiochus II Theos, poisoned by his wife Laodice I
 241 BC Agis IV of Sparta, executed by ephors without a regular trial
 233 BC Deidamia II of Epirus, assassinated during a republican revolt
 227 BC Archidamus V of Sparta, assassinated possibly by orders of his co-ruler Cleomenes III
 223 BC Seleucus III Ceraunus, assassinated in Anatolia by members of his army
 223 BC Diodotus II of Bactria, killed by the usurper Euthydemus I
 214 BC Hieronymus of Syracuse, assassinated by conspirators
 207 BC Qin Er Shi through forced suicide put on him by his eunuch Zhao Gao
 206 BC Ziying executed by Xiang Yu

2nd century BC 
 185 BC Brihadratha Maurya of India, assassinated by Pushyamitra Shunga during a military parade
 149 BC Prusias II of Bithynia, assassinated by supporters of his son
 120 BC Mithridates V of Pontus, poisoned at a banquet
 116/111 BC Ariarathes VI of Cappadocia murdered by Gordius for Mithridates VI of Pontus
 104 BC Jugurtha, King of Numidia, captured by Roman army, paraded in Rome and starved to death in prison

1st century BC 
 100 BC Ariarathes VII of Cappadocia murdered by Mithridates VI of Pontus
 80 BC Ptolemy XI Alexander II, lynched by the citizens of Alexandria
 51 BC Ariobarzanes II of Cappadocia, assassinated by Parthian favorites
 44 BC Burebista, Great King (Emperor) of Dacia was assassinated by the indigenous nobles and his advisors.
 44 BC Ptolemy XIV of Egypt, widely suspected to have been poisoned by Cleopatra VII
 42 BC Ariobarzanes III of Cappadocia, executed by Gaius Cassius Longinus
 36 BC Ariarathes X of Cappadocia, executed by Mark Antony
 30 BC Caesarion of Egypt, executed by Octavian
 29 BC Antiochus II of Commagene, executed by Octavian

1st century 
 25 AD the Gengshi Emperor by strangulation from Xie Lu
 41 Caligula, the Emperor of Rome by a praetorian guard and a group of conspirators supported by the Roman senate
 69 Galba of Rome by the praetorian guard
 69 Vitellius of Rome by troops of an indigenous commander of eastern provinces
 96 Domitian of Rome by a group of court officials

2nd century 
 190 Emperor Shao of Han forced to drink poison by rebels
 192 Commodus of Rome strangled by his wrestling partner supported by a group of conspirators
 193 Pertinax of Rome murdered by Praetorian guard
 193 Didius Julianus of Rome executed on orders by the senate

3rd century 
 217 Caracalla murdered by a soldier
 218 Macrinus, executed by Elagabalus
 222 Elagabalus murdered by Praetorian guard
 235 Severus Alexander murdered by the army
 238 Maximinus I murdered by Praetorian guard
 238 Pupienus murdered by Praetorian guard
 238 Balbinus murdered by Praetorian guard
 253 Trebonianus Gallus by his own troops
 253 Aemilian by his own troops
 268 Gallienus murdered by his own commanders
 275 Aurelian assassinated by Praetorian guard
 276 Florianus assassinated by his own troops
 282 Marcus Aurelius Probus assassinated by his own troops

4th century 
 307 Severus II forced to commit suicide by Maxentius
 310 Maximian forced to commit suicide by Constantine I
 325 Licinius executed on orders by Constantine I
 350 Constans killed by supporters of Magnentius
 359 Gratian murdered by army faction

5th century 
 423 Joannes captured and executed by eastern Roman army
 453 Emperor Wen of Liu Song by Crown Prince Liu Shao
 455 Valentinian III assassinated
 456 Emperor Ankō of Japan, by Prince Mayowa

6th century 
 565 Diarmait mac Cerbaill, King of Tara, by Áed Dub mac Suibni
 592 Emperor Sushun of Japan, by Soga no Umako

7th century 
 602 Maurice, Byzantine Emperor, beheaded
 610 Phocas, Byzantine Emperor, executed
 618 Emperor Yang of Sui, strangled by soldier in coup
 656 Uthman ibn Affan, Caliph of Islamic Caliphate, assassinated by rebels
 668 Constans II, Byzantine Emperor, assassinated

8th century 
 710 Emperor Zhongzong of Tang poisoned by his wife Empress Wei

9th Century 

 882 Pope John VIII of the Papal States, assassinated by other clerics via poisoning and clubbing
 897 Pope Stephen VI of the Papal States, imprisoned and strangled

10th century 
 904 Pope Leo V of the Papal States, either murdered by Antipope Christopher or executed on the orders of either Pope Sergius III or Theophylact I of Tusculum
 904 Emperor Zhaozong of Tang by soldiers sent by Zhu Quanzhong
 908 Emperor Ai of Tang poisoned on orders by Zhu Quanzhong
 928, Pope John X of the Papal States, killed by Guy of Tuscany either by smothering him with a pillow or by poor prison conditions
 935 Wenceslaus I, Duke of Bohemia killed by his younger brother Boleslaus the Cruel
 964 Pope John XII of the Papal States, allegedly murdered by a man whose wife he had committed adultery with.
 974 Pope Benedict VI of the Papal States, assassinated via strangulation by a priest on the orders of Antipope Boniface VII
 978 Edward the martyr killed in unclear circumstances
 984 Pope John XIV of the Papal States, killed by unknown means after being taken captive by Antipope Boniface VII

11th century 
 1014 Brian Boru killed in unclear circumstances
 1046 Pope Clement II of the Papal States, rumored to have been poisoned, which was later corroborated by toxicology tests on his remains.
 1072 Sancho II of Castile and León assassinated by Vellido Dolfos

12th century 
 1156 Sverker I of Sweden assassinated by his servant possibly on the orders of Magnus Henriksson
 1157 Eystein II of Norway was killed by his captors after being defeated in battle by Inge I Haraldsson
 1160 Eric IX of Sweden assassinated by an armed group lead by Magnus II of Sweden and possibly the Sverkers
 1161 Magnus II of Sweden killed in battle
 1161 Inge I of Norway killed after being defeated in battle by Haakon II of Norway
 1162 Haakon II of Norway killed in the battle of Sekken
 1167 Charles VII of Sweden assassinated by the rival Eric dynasty lead by  Knut Eriksson
 1174 Andrey Bogolyubsky, Prince of Rus, was murdered by members of Kuchkovich family
 1184 Magnus V of Norway killed in the Battle of Fimreite
 1192 Conrad of Montferrat, King of Jerusalem, assassins unknown to history
 1199 Richard I of England shot with crossbow by Pierre Basile

13th century 
 1206 Muhammad of Ghor, Sultan of the Ghurid Empire, assassinated while doing evening prayers
 1208 Philip of Swabia, king of Germany, assassinated by Otto VIII, Count Palatine of Bavaria
 1210 Sverker II of Sweden was killed in battle by Folke Jarl
1213 Peter II of Aragon is killed by a northern crusader knight and lieutenant of Simon de Montfort, 5th Earl of Leicester; Alan de Renty during the Battle of Muret
 1227 Ken Arok, King of Singhasari, by his stepson Anusapati
 1240 Skule Bårdsson who was a pretender to the throne of Norway was killed in battle against Haakon IV of Norway
1250 Eric IV of Denmark killed by Abel, King of Denmark's chamberlain Lave Gudmundsen
1252 Abel, King of Denmark killed by Henner the Wheelright at Husum Bridge en route to fight Frisian Peasants
1259 Christopher I of Denmark poisoned by abbot Arnfast of Ryd Abbey in revenge for mistreatment of Archbishop Erlendson
1286 Eric V of Denmark assassinated by a group of conspirators led by his Marshal Stig Andersen Hvide and his vassal Jacob Nielsen, Count of Halland
1290 Ladislaus IV of Hungary assassinated by three Cumans Árbóc, Törtel, and Kemence, at the castle of Körösszeg
 1296 Przemysł II, King of Poland, by the Margraves of Brandenburg, some Polish families, or maybe both

14th century 
 1306 Wenceslaus III of Bohemia, King of Bohemia, Hungary and Poland
 1308 Albert I of_Germany, King of Germany, murdered by his nephew John Parricida
 1323 Emperor Gong of Song, forced to commit suicide by Emperor Yingzong of Yuan
 1323 Emperor Yingzong of Yuan by a plot formed among Yesün Temür's supporters
 1327 Edward II of England after forced abdication on behalf of son Edward III of England
 1328 Jayanegara, King of Majapahit, by Ra Tanca, his doctor
 1359 Berdi Beg of the Golden Horde by his brother Qulpa
 1382 Joanna I of Naples was murdered by her cousin Charles II of Hungary
 1386 Charles II of Hungary by Blaise Forgách
 1389 Murad I, Ottoman Sultan, assassinated by Serbian knight Miloš Obilić
 1389 Mansa Maghan II of Mali, usurped and killed by Mansa Sandaki
 1390 Mansa Sandaki of Mali, usurped and killed by Mansa Maghan III/Mahmud I, brother of Maghan II

15th century 
 1402 the Jianwen Emperor was claimed to have been burned to death in his palace by Zhu Di
 1483 Edward V of England by either Richard III or some other party
 1488 Alauddin Riayat Shah of Malacca was poisoned by his officer.

16th century 
 1513 Ahmad Shah of Malacca was murdered by his father who later succeed him.
 1520 Moctezuma II, Emperor of the Aztecs, by either the Spanish forces led by Hernán Cortés or his own people
 1532 Huáscar, Emperor of the Incas, executed by his brother Atahualpa
 1533 Atahualpa, Emperor of the Incas, executed by the Spanish
 1587 Mary, Queen of Scots executed after a trial by an English court of 36 noblemen over the Babington Plot
 1589 Henry III of France by Jacques Clément

17th century 
 1605 False Dmitry I, an impostor who ascended Russian throne, was overthrown and killed by a local mob in Moscow, who shot his remains out of a cannon
 1610 Henry IV of France by François Ravaillac
 1622 Osman II of the Ottoman Empire by the Grand Vizier Davud Pasha
 1648 Ibrahim executed by orders from his mother Kösem Sultan
 1649 Charles I of England executed following a trial set up by the Rump Parliament
 1699  Mahmud II , Sultan of Johor murdered by Megat Seri Rama, his admiral in carriage.

18th century 
 1747 Nader Shah of the Afshar Dynasty, Shahanshah of Persia (Iran) by Salah Bey
 1762 Peter III of Russia deposed and supposedly murdered shortly thereafter
 1782 Taksin, King of Thailand, deposed and executed in a coup
 1792 Gustav III of Sweden by Jacob Johan Anckarström
 1793 Louis XVI of France executed following a trial by the National Convention

19th century 
 1801 Emperor Paul of Russia by Count Pahlen and his accomplices
 1815 Joachim Murat, executed in Calabria by orders of Ferdinand I of the Two Sicilies
 1828 Shaka King of the Zulus by his half-brother and successor Dingane and accomplices
 1855 Hamengkubuwono V of Yogyakarta by his fifth wife, Kanjeng Mas Hemawati
 1867 Maximilian I of Mexico executed after a Mexican court-martial
 1881 Alexander II of Russia by Ignacy Hryniewiecki, a member of Narodnaya Volya (People's Will)
 1895 Min of Joseon by three mercenary killers allegedly hired by Japanese minister to Korea Miura Goro
 1896 Nasser al-Din Shah, Qajar king of Persia (Iran), by Mirza Reza Kermani
 1900 Umberto I of Italy by anarchist Gaetano Bresci

20th century 
 1903 Alexander I of Serbia and his wife Queen Draga by a group of army officers
 1908 Carlos I of Portugal, assassinated with his son Infante Luís Filipe, Prince Royal of Portugal by Alfredo Luís da Costa and Manuel Buiça, both connected to the Carbonária (the Portuguese section of the Carbonari)
 1908 The Guangxu Emperor by arsenic poisoning, perhaps on orders from Empress Dowager Cixi or Yuan Shikai.
 1913 George I of Greece by Alexandros Schinas
 1918 Nicholas II of Russia and the Imperial Family - including Tsarevich Alexei Romanov, who is sometimes referred to as Alexei II -  executed by a Bolshevik firing squad under the command of Yakov Yurovsky
 1933 Mohammed Nadir Shah, king of Afghanistan, assassinated by student Abdul Khaliq Hazara
 1934 Alexander I of Yugoslavia by  Vlado Chernozemski, a member of the Internal Macedonian Revolutionary Organization
 1936 George V of the United Kingdom, involuntarily euthanized by Lord Dawson of Penn
 1938 Queen Genepil was shot during Stalinist repressions in Mongolia.
 1946 Ananda Mahidol of Thailand. The King's death is still a mystery and may have been either regicide or suicide.
 1948 Yahya Muhammad Hamid ed-Din, king of North Yemen, assassinated in the Alwaziri coup
 1951 Abdullah I of Jordan by Mustafa Ashi
 1958 Faisal II of Iraq executed by firing squad under the command of Captain Abdus Sattar As Sab, a member of the coup d'état led by Colonel Abdul Karim Qassim
 1975 Faisal of Saudi Arabia by his nephew Faisal bin Musa'id (Assassin publicly beheaded)
 1975 Haile Selassie I of Ethiopia, widely suspected to have been murdered in his sleep by asphyxiation on the orders of the Derg junta, which had deposed him a year earlier.

21st century 
 2001 Birendra of Nepal, killed by his son Crown Prince Dipendra, in the Nepalese royal massacre.

References

 
Regicides
Lists of murderers